Thalangara is a part of Kasaragod Town, the district headquarters of the Kasaragod district in the South Indian state of Kerala. Malik Deenar Jama Masjid and Dargah is located here. Its economy is dependent on remittance from expatriate workers in the Persian Gulf, particularly Dubai. Thalangara consists of areas like Padinhar(Westyork), Kunnil, Kadavath ("ferry stand"), Khazilane, Nuppadamail, Bangod, Theruvath, and Korkode ("street" in Malayalam). The areas of Thalangara consist of smaller mohallas (localities) and each locality has its own mosque and madrassa. 

Thalangara also houses the oldest and the biggest hospital in Kasargod district, the Malik Dinar Charitable Hospital, established in 1970 by Janab KS Abdullah. This institution is an educational centre of Kasaragod, with a School of Nursing, College of Nursing, B. Pharm and D. Pharm colleges.

Malik Deenar
Malik Deenar, Arabic مالك دينار  is said by Malabar Muslims to be the first generation follower of the Islamic prophet Muhammed who came to India to propagate Islam in the Indian Subcontinent. His grave is located at Thalangara which is consecrated inside a structure that was formerly a Tharavad of a local Tulu Chief.

Malik Deenar Grand Juma Masjid
Malik Deenar Mosque, formally Malik Deenar Grand Juma Masjid, is a mosque located about a kilometre from Kasaragod, Kerala, India, on the coast. The mosque is dedicated to Malik Deenar, who arrived from Arabia with his family on a mission to spread Islam on the coast of Kerala. It was originally built around 642. Years later, the mosque was reconstructed in 1809. In 2018, the Mosque was renovated under the guidance of T.A. Abdul Rahiman Haji (Nephew of Late K.S.Abdullah).

Thalangara Thoppi
Thalangara Thoppi is a traditional Muslim cap produced in Thalangara by hand. It was made in homes and was a thriving business generating large-scale employment. These caps even had an overseas market mainly in gulf and African countries. This industry played an important role in the economy of Thalangara. As mechanized production caps brought down market prices, handmade Thalangara caps were not able to compete, and the production has been significantly reduced in recent years.

Image gallery

References 

Suburbs of Kasaragod